The 1942 Brown Bears football team represented Brown University during the 1942 college football season.

In their second season under head coach Jacob N. "Skip" Stahley, the Bears compiled a 4–4 record, and were outscored 114 to 96 by opponents. Team captains were named on a game-by-game basis.  

Brown played its home games at Brown Stadium on the East Side of Providence, Rhode Island.

Schedule

References

Brown
Brown Bears football seasons
Brown Bears football